Chrysococcus is a genus of golden algae in the family Dinobryaceae.

Species

References

External links
 Chrysococcus at algaebase.org
 Chrysococcus at the World Register of Marine Species (WoRMS)

Chrysophyceae
Algae genera
Heterokont genera